is a Japanese model and actor. From 2015 to 2017, he was an exclusive model for the fashion magazines Samurai Elo and Popteen.

Career

Modeling career

Kominami was a model for the hair salon Ocean Tokyo and was later scouted to model professionally. From 2015 to 2017, Kominami was an exclusive model for the fashion magazines Samurai Elo and Popteen. During his time at Popteen, he was referred to the nickname "Konan", and, in 2016, he was awarded 2nd place in Popteen's 2nd Handsome General Election. He modeled at the Kansai Collection 2016 Spring & Summer show, the Kansai Collection 2017 Spring & Summer show, and the Cho Jidai: Ultra Teens Fes 2017 show.

Filmography

Television

Theatre

Music video

Film

Publications

Photobooks

References

External links
  

21st-century Japanese male actors
Japanese male models
Japanese male stage actors
Living people
1994 births